The 2000 Arab Junior Athletics Championships was the ninth edition of the international athletics competition for under-20 athletes from Arab countries. It took place in Damascus, Syria – the second consecutive time the city hosted the tournament, and a sixth hosting for Syria. A total of 42 athletics events were contested, 22 for men and 20 for women. Neither Morocco, Algeria nor Qatar—all regional powers in the sport—sent a team to the meeting, which impacted the overall quality of performances.

Egypt topped the table with nineteen gold medals, having won the majority of the women's events. Saudi Arabia was runner-up with ten gold medals – all were in the men's section, reflecting the nation's ban on women athletes. The hosts, Syria, placed third with their six gold medals. Lebanon won its first gold medal in the history of the tournament, topping the podium in the women's 4×100 m relay. The women's programme was expanded with the introduction of the hammer throw, bringing the throws events to parity with men. A minority of track finals had times recorded only to a tenth of a second due to technical restrictions.

The foremost athletes to emerge from the competition were among the Saudi contingent. Mubarak Ata Mubarak added an Asian senior title to his 110 metres hurdles gold that same year. Hamdan Al-Bishi and Hamed Al-Bishi both won multiple sprint medals at the Asian Athletics Championships over the following years.  Omar Ahmed El Ghazaly of Egypt won the discus here and later won several African titles in that discipline. Mohammad Al-Azemi, only an 800 m runner-up here, went on to a middle-distance double at the 2011 Asian Athletics Championships. Ismail Ahmed Ismail (1500 m) was also a runner-up in Damascus but went on to the greatest honour among the participants by winning Sudan's first Olympic medal in 2008. On the women's side, his fellow Sudanese middle-distance runner Hind Roko Musa, took an Arab junior double.  Egypt's Ines Abul Ala Mohamed (sprints) and Maha Mohamed Mohamed (100 m hurdles, high jump, and heptathlon) were other multiple champions at the competition.

Medal summary

Men

Women

Medal table

References

Arab Junior Athletics Championships
International athletics competitions hosted by Syria
Sport in Damascus
Arab Junior Athletics Championships
Arab Junior Athletics Championships
21st century in Damascus
2000 in youth sport